Isaak Izrailevich Mints (1896-1991) was the leading Soviet historian in the early and mid-twentieth century. In 1949 he lost most of his academic positions following a campaign against him by his colleague Arkadiĭ Sidorov that was part of the drive by Joseph Stalin to eliminate the "rootless cosmopolitans", most of whom were Jewish.

Early life and education
Isaak Mints was born in 1896.

Career
Mints was the leading Soviet historian in the early and mid-twentieth century. In 1949 he lost most of his academic positions following a campaign against him by his colleague Arkadiĭ Sidorov that was part of the drive by Joseph Stalin to eliminate the "rootless cosmopolitans", most of whom were Jewish. Despite this, in 1953 he arranged for Soviet Jews to write a letter to Pravda condemning Zionism, Israel, and the "doctors' plot".

Death
Mints died in 1991.

Selected publications
 Istoriia Velikogo Oktiabria (History of the Great October) (3 vols.)

References

External links
https://w.histrf.ru/articles/article/show/mints_isaak_izrailievich

1896 births
1991 deaths
People from Dnipropetrovsk Oblast
Jewish historians
Soviet historians
Russian Jews
Ukrainian Jews
Historians of Russia
Russian communists
Institute of Red Professors alumni
Historians of communism
Academic staff of Moscow State University
Stalin Prize winners
Members of the Russian Academy of Sciences and its forerunners
Lenin Prize winners